Amani Ballour (born 1987) is a Syrian-born pediatrician and an advocate of women's and children's rights. Her story is portrayed by the Oscar-nominated documentary The Cave, which tells of the struggles of running an underground hospital during the Syrian civil war.

Early life
Ballour was born and grew up in the east of Ghouta. She is the youngest among two brothers and three sisters. Her sisters married and became homemakers at a young age; the eldest was 15. Ballour, on the other hand, wanted to do more. She persisted on completing her education.

Education
Ballour had always wanted to be an Engineer, so she took up Mechanical Engineering at Damascus University despite experiencing gossip from others and receiving opposition from her family due to gender-based expectations. Her family, particularly her father, refused to support her until she eventually shifted to pediatrics. In 2012, she finished her general medical studies at the same university. She began studying pediatrics until she immediately abandoned it to help the casualties of Syrian Civil War.

Saving Lives Amid The War
At 24, Ballour was triggered to abandon her studies when she was summoned by neighbors to treat a 12-year-old wounded boy. The boy was a victim of the government's attempt to crush rallies. He was a bystander during the protest and was shot with a bullet in his head. The boy's family was worried that the authorities would seize them if they went to the hospital, so they came to Ballour instead. When they arrived, the boy was already dead.

Ballour started as a volunteer in a nearby, rebel stronghold hospital in Ghouta. There were only a few doctors, and there were only two full-time physicians like her. The hospital was intended to be a big, six-story medical center, and it was under construction during that time. The hospital operated despite frequent attacks from the government, until authorities successfully seized the area. With thirteen other doctors, Ballour decided to continue operating underground, beneath the unfinished building. The subterranean clinic was eventually known as the Cave; as its popularity grew, more medical volunteers appeared. The hospital thrived despite the siege. At times, they were able to use smuggled medical stocks paid by international and local NGOs, and equipments taken from other destroyed hospitals.

Ballour is no trauma surgeon, but with the influx of casualties amid the Syrian Civil War, doctors in The Cave have to treat the wounded even though their affliction was not their specialty. Ballour recalled treating victims with missing limbs, and victims of chemical attacks who were suffocating in the subterranean hospital. The government bombed the hospital many times. She kept detailed journals about the days and the attacks.

In 2016, at 29 years old, Ballour was elected and promoted as the hospital director. She became the first and only woman to manage a hospital in Syria. She ran the hospital until the Assad regime quelled the last resistance in 2018. Since then, Ballour have been exiled. She was forced to flee Syria and spent some time living in a refugee camp in Turkey.

References

Syrian women physicians
Damascus University alumni
Syrian women activists
1987 births
Living people